Alfred Josoa (born November 16, 1943 in Antsohihy) is a Malagasy politician. He is a member of the Senate of Madagascar for Sofia Region, and is a member of the Tiako I Madagasikara party.

External links
Official page on the Senate website

1943 births
Living people
Members of the Senate (Madagascar)
Tiako I Madagasikara politicians
People from Sofia Region